Blasey is an English surname. Notable people with the surname include:

 Christine Blasey, American professor of psychology 
 Scott Blasey, American rock musician

See also 
 Lawrence Edwin Blazey (1902–1999), American artist

References